( ), which literally means "martial heroes", is a genre of Chinese fiction concerning the adventures of martial artists in ancient China. Although  is traditionally a form of historical fantasy literature, its popularity has caused it to be adapted for such diverse art forms as Chinese opera, manhua, television dramas, films, and video games. It forms part of popular culture in many Chinese-speaking communities around the world.

In some translations, the martial artist is referred to as a "swordsman" or "swordswoman" even though they may not necessarily wield a sword.

The heroes in wuxia fiction typically do not serve a lord, wield military power, or belong to the aristocratic class. They often originate from the lower social classes of ancient Chinese society. A code of chivalry usually requires wuxia heroes to right and redress wrongs, fight for righteousness, remove oppressors, and bring retribution for past misdeeds. Chinese  traditions can be compared to martial codes from other cultures, such as the Japanese samurai .

History

Earlier precedents
Even though the term "wuxia" as the name of a genre is a recent coinage, stories about xia date back more than 2,000 years. Wuxia stories have their roots in some early youxia tales from 300–200 BC. The Legalist philosopher Han Fei spoke disparagingly of youxias in his book Han Feizi in the chapter On Five 'Maggot' Classes about five social classes in the Spring and Autumn period. Some well-known stories include Zhuan Zhu's assassination of King Liao of Wu, and most notably, Jing Ke's attempt on the life of the King of Qin (who later became Qin Shi Huang). In Volume 86 of the Records of the Grand Historian (Shi Ji), Sima Qian mentioned five notable assassins – Cao Mo, Zhuan Zhu, Yu Rang, Nie Zheng and Jing Ke – in the Warring States period who undertook tasks of conducting political assassinations of aristocrats and nobles. These assassins were known as cike (刺客; literally "stabbing guests"). They usually rendered their loyalties and services to feudal lords and nobles in return for rewards such as riches and women. In Volume 124 of the Shi Ji, Sima Qian detailed several embryonic features of xia culture from his period. These popular phenomena were also documented in other historical records such as the Book of Han and the Book of the Later Han.

Xiake stories made a turning point in the Tang dynasty (618–907) and returned in the form of chuanqi (傳奇; literally "legendary tales"). Stories from that era, such as Nie Yinniang (聶隱娘), The Kunlun Slave, Thirteenth Madame Jing (荊十三娘), Red String (紅線) and The Bearded Warrior (虬髯客), served as prototypes for modern wuxia stories. They featured fantasies and isolated protagonists – usually loners – who performed daring heroic deeds. During the Song dynasty (960–1279), similar stories circulated in the huaben, short works that were once thought to have served as prompt-books for shuochang (traditional Chinese storytelling).

The genre of the martial or military romance also developed during the Tang dynasty. In the Ming dynasty (1368-1644), Luo Guanzhong and Shi Nai'an wrote Romance of the Three Kingdoms and Water Margin respectively, which are among the Great Classical Novels of Chinese literature. The former is a romanticised historical retelling of the events in the late Eastern Han dynasty and the Three Kingdoms period, while the latter criticises the deplorable socio-economic status of the late Northern Song dynasty. Water Margin is often seen as the first full-length wuxia novel: the portrayal of the 108 heroes, and their code of honour and willingness to become outlaws rather than serve a corrupt government, played an influential role in the development of jianghu culture in later centuries. Romance of the Three Kingdoms is also seen as a possible early antecedent and contains classic close-combat descriptions that were later emulated by wuxia writers in their works

In the Qing dynasty (1644-1911), further developments were the gong'an (公案; literally "public case") and related detective novels, where xia and other heroes, in collaboration with a judge or magistrate, solved crimes and battled injustice. The Justice Bao stories from Sanxia Wuyi (三俠五義; later extended and renamed to Qixia Wuyi) and Xiaowuyi (小五義), incorporated much of social justice themes of later wuxia stories. Xiayi stories of chivalrous romance, which frequently featured female heroes and supernatural fighting abilities, also surfaced during the Qing dynasty. Novels such as Shi Gong'an Qiwen (施公案奇聞) and Ernü Yingxiong Zhuan (兒女英雄傳) have been cited as the clearest nascent wuxia novels.

The term "wuxia" as a genre label itself first appeared at the end of the Qing dynasty, a calque of the Japanese "bukyō", a genre of oft-militaristic and bushido-influenced adventure fiction. The term was brought to China by writers such as Liang Qichao and students who hoped that China would modernise its military and place emphasis on martial virtues, and it quickly became entrenched as the term used to refer to xiayi and other predecessors of wuxia proper. In Japan, however, the term "bukyō" faded into obscurity.

Many wuxia works produced during the Ming and Qing dynasties were lost due to the governments' crackdown on and banning of such works. Wuxia works like Water Margin were deemed responsible for brewing anti-government sentiments, which led to rebellions in those eras. The departure from mainstream literature also meant that patronage of this genre was limited to the masses and not to the literati, which led to the stifling of the development of the wuxia genre. Nonetheless, the wuxia genre remained enormously popular with the common people.

20th century
The modern wuxia genre rose to prominence in the early 20th century after the May Fourth Movement of 1919. A new literature evolved, calling for a break with Confucian values, and the xia emerged as a symbol of personal freedom, defiance to Confucian tradition, and rejection of the Chinese family system.

Xiang Kairan (pen name Pingjiang Buxiaosheng) became the first notable wuxia writer, with his debut novel being The Peculiar Knights-Errant of the Jianghu (江湖奇俠傳). It was serialised from 1921–28 and was adapted into the first wuxia film, The Burning of the Red Lotus Temple (1928). Zhao Huanting (趙煥亭), who wrote Chronicles of the Loyal Knights-Errant (奇俠精忠傳, serialised 1923–27), was another well-known wuxia writer based in Shanghai. Starting from the 1930s, wuxia works proliferated and its centre shifted to Beijing and Tianjin in northern China. The most prolific writers there were collectively referred to as the Five Great Masters of the Northern School (北派五大家): Huanzhulouzhu, who wrote The Swordspeople from Shu Mountains (蜀山劍俠傳); Gong Baiyu (宮白羽), who wrote Twelve Coin Darts (十二金錢鏢); Wang Dulu, who wrote The Crane-Iron Pentalogy (鹤鉄五部作); Zheng Zhengyin (郑証因), who wrote The King of Eagle Claws (鹰爪王); Zhu Zhenmu (朱貞木), who wrote The Seven 'Kill' Stele (七殺碑).

Wuxia fiction was banned at various times during the Republican era and these restrictions stifled the growth of the genre. The Communist Party also banned wuxia, literature, calling it “decadent” and “feudal.” In spite of this, wuxia prevailed in other Chinese-speaking regions, such as Taiwan and Hong Kong. Between the 1960s and 1980s, the genre entered a golden age. Writers such as Liang Yusheng and Louis Cha (Jin Yong) spearheaded the founding of a "new school" of the wuxia genre that differed largely from its predecessors. They wrote serials for newspapers and magazines. They also incorporated several fictional themes such as mystery and romance from other cultures. In Taiwan, Wolong Sheng, Sima Ling, Zhuge Qingyun (諸葛青雲), Shiao Yi (萧逸) and Gu Long became the region's best known wuxia writers. After them, writers such as Woon Swee Oan and Huang Yi rose to prominence in a later period. Chen Yu-hui is a contemporary female wuxia novelist who made her debut with the novel The Tian-Guan Duo Heroes (天觀雙俠).

There have also been works created after the 1980s which attempt to create a post-wuxia genre. Yu Hua, one of the more notable writers from this period, published a counter-genre short story titled Blood and Plum Blossoms, in which the protagonist goes on a quest to avenge his murdered father.

Themes, plots and settings

Modern wuxia stories are largely set in ancient or pre-modern China. The historical setting can range from being quite specific and important to the story, to being vaguely-defined, anachronistic, or mainly for use as a backdrop. Elements of fantasy, such as the use of magic powers and appearance of supernatural beings, are common in some wuxia stories but are not a prerequisite of the wuxia genre. However, the martial arts element is a definite part of a wuxia tale, as the characters must know some form of martial arts. Themes of romance are also strongly featured in some wuxia tales.

A typical wuxia story features a young male protagonist who experiences a tragedy – such as the loss of his loved ones – and goes on to undertake several trials and tribulations to learn several forms of martial arts from various fighters. At the end of the story, he emerges as a powerful fighter whom few can equal. He uses his abilities to follow the code of xia and mends the ills of the jianghu. For instance, the opening chapters of some of Jin Yong's works follow a certain pattern: a tragic event occurs, usually one that costs the lives of the newly introduced characters, and then it sets events into motion that will culminate in the primary action of the story.

Other stories use different structures. For instance, the protagonist is denied admission into a martial arts school. He experiences hardships and trains secretly and waits until there is an opportunity for him to show off his skills and surprise those who initially looked down on him. Some stories feature a mature hero with powerful martial arts abilities confronting an equally powerful antagonist as his nemesis. The plot will gradually meander to a final dramatic showdown between the protagonist and his nemesis. These types of stories were prevalent during the era of anti-Qing revolutionaries.

Certain stories have unique plots, such as those by Gu Long and Huang Yi. Gu Long's works have an element of mystery and are written like detective stories. The protagonist, usually a formidable martial artist and intelligent problem-solver, embarks on a quest to solve a mystery such as a murder case. Huang Yi's stories are blended with science fiction.

Despite these genre-blending elements, wuxia is primarily a historical genre of fiction. Notwithstanding this, wuxia writers openly admit that they are unable to capture the entire history of a course of events and instead choose to structure their stories along the pattern of the protagonist's progression from childhood to adulthood instead. The progression may be symbolic rather than literal, as observed in Jin Yong's The Smiling, Proud Wanderer, where Linghu Chong progresses from childish concerns and dalliances into much more adult ones as his unwavering loyalty repeatedly thrusts him into the rocks of betrayal at the hands of his inhumane master.

Code of xia
The eight common attributes of the xia are listed as benevolence, justice, individualism, loyalty, courage, truthfulness, disregard for wealth, and desire for glory. Apart from individualism, these characteristics are similar to Confucian values such as ren (仁; "benevolence", "kindness"), zhong (忠; "loyalty"), yong (勇; "courage", "bravery") and yi (義; "righteousness"). The code of xia also emphasises the importance of repaying benefactors after having received deeds of en (恩; "grace", "favour") from others, as well as seeking chou (仇; "vengeance", "revenge") to bring villains to justice. However, the importance of vengeance is controversial, as a number of wuxia works stress Buddhist ideals, which include forgiveness, compassion and a prohibition on killing.

In the jianghu, martial artists are expected to be loyal to their master (Shifu). This gives rise to the formation of several complex trees of master-apprentice relations as well as the various schools such as Shaolin and Wudang. If there are any disputes between fighters, they will choose the honourable way of settling their issues through fighting in duels.

Skills and abilities

The martial arts in wuxia stories are based on wushu techniques and other real life Chinese martial arts. In wuxia tales, however, the mastery of such skills are highly exaggerated to superhuman levels of achievement and prowess.

The following is a list of skills and abilities a typical fighter in a wuxia story possesses:

 Martial arts (武功): Fighting techniques in a codified sequence called zhaoshi (招式), which are based on real life Chinese martial arts.
 Weapons and objects: Combatants use a wide range of weapons in combat. The most commonly used ones are the dao (broadsword or saber), jian (sword), gun (staff), and qiang (spear). Everyday objects such as abaci, benches, fans, ink brushes, smoking pipes, sewing needles, or various musical instruments, are also used as weapons as well.
 Qinggong (轻功): A form of real Chinese martial arts. In wuxia fiction, however, its use is exaggerated to the point that characters can circumvent gravity to fly, cover tremendous distances in a single stride, run across surfaces of water, mount trees, and jump over or scale high walls.
 Neili (内力; lit "internal force" or "internal strength")/Neigong (內功; literally "internal skill" or "internal function"): The ability to build up and cultivate inner energy known as qi and utilise it for offensive or defensive purposes. Characters use this energy to attain skills such as superhuman strength, speed, stamina, endurance, and healing, as well as the ability to project energy beams and elemental forces from their bodies.
 Dianxue (點穴; literally "touching acupuncture points"): Characters use various acupuncture techniques to kill, paralyse, immobilise or even manipulate opponents by attacking their acupressure points with their bare hands or weapons. Such techniques can also be used for healing purposes, such as halting excessive bleeding. Real life martial artists do use such techniques to paralyse or stun their opponents. However, their effectiveness is highly exaggerated in wuxia stories.

In wuxia stories, characters attain the above skills and abilities by devoting themselves to years of diligent study and exercise, but can also have such power conferred upon them by a master who transfers his energy to them. The instructions to mastering these skills through training are found in secret manuals known as miji (秘笈). In some stories, specific skills can be learned by spending several years in seclusion with a master or training with a group of fighters.

Menpai (门派)

Menpai is often translated as sect, school, society, church, house, or cult. Members of the same menpai follow the guidance and train under the same leader. If the members of the menpai are related, then it can be translated as clan. Since some of the menpai are religiously affiliated, "sect" has come to be a common translation for the non-family based menpai. However, it would be inaccurate to use sect to denote menpais that are not associated with religion.

Literature
Notable modern wuxia writers include:

Comics
New and original wuxia writings have dwindled significantly in modern times, particularly so as patronage and readerships of the genre decimated due to readily available alternatives in entertainment such as DVDs, gaming consoles, and other newer forms of entertainment. However, the genre has persisted in the form of manhua (Chinese comics) in places like Hong Kong and Taiwan, with the core essentials of the wuxia genre living on in weekly editions equivalent to the Japanese manga.

Some notable comic artists are listed as follows:

Film and television

The earliest wuxia films date back to the 1920s. Extant early wuxia films produced in China include Red Heroine (1929), Woman Warrior White Rose (1929), and Woman Warrior of the Wild River 6: Rumble at Deerhorn Gully (1930), the sixth film in a series. Hua Mu Lan (1939), another surviving film, is considered a representative of the second wave of wuxia films, during the Anti-Japanese War. Films directed by King Hu and produced by the Shaw Brothers Studio featured sophisticated action choreography using wire and trampoline assisted acrobatics combined with sped-up camera techniques. The storylines in the early films were loosely adapted from existing literature.

Cheng Pei-pei, Jimmy Wang and Connie Chan are among the better known wuxia movie stars in the 1960s–70s, when films made by King Hu and the Shaw Brothers Studio were most prominent. More recent wuxia movie actors and actresses include Jet Li, Brigitte Lin, Michelle Yeoh, Donnie Yen, Tony Leung and Zhang Ziyi. Yuen Woo-ping is a choreographer who achieved fame by crafting action-sequences in wuxia films.

Wuxia was introduced to Hollywood studios in 2000 by Ang Lee's Crouching Tiger, Hidden Dragon, though influence of the genre was previously seen in the United States in the 1970s television series Kung Fu. Following in Lee's footsteps, Zhang Yimou made Hero, targeted for the international market in 2002, House of Flying Daggers in 2004, Curse of the Golden Flower in 2006 and Shadow in 2018. Western audiences were also introduced to wuxia through Asian television stations in larger cities, which featured miniseries such as Warriors of the Yang Clan and Paradise, often with English subtitles.

A modern film that refers to the underworld interpretation of jianghu, is Ash Is Purest White
(Chinese: 江湖儿女; 'Sons and Daughters of Jianghu'), a 2018 Chinese drama directed by Jia Zhangke. It was selected to compete for the Palme d'Or at the 2018 Cannes Film Festival. The story is loosely based on the leader of a gang from Jia Zhangke's childhood, whom he had admired as a role model. Like the rest of Jia's films, it opened to widespread acclaim.

There have been Western attempts at the genre, such as the 2008 film The Forbidden Kingdom, which starred Jackie Chan, Jet Li and Michael Angarano; other movies including wuxia elements are the first three in The Matrix film series (1999-2003, the fourth one from 2021 was choreographed by Joshua Grothe) and the Kill Bill films from 2003-2004, all of which were choregraphed by Yuen Woo-Ping. Perhaps the most successful example was DreamWorks Animation's media franchise Kung Fu Panda. Created as an earnest, if humorous, emulation by producers who were knowledgeable admirers of the genre, the series has been particularly hailed in China as an excellent contribution to the form. From the 1990s–2000s, Hong Kong stars Daniel Wu and Stephen Fung have worked with AMC Networks to bring wuxia to a US television audience with Into the Badlands, which premiered in 2015 and ran for three seasons.

In 2013, Keanu Reeves directed and starred as the main antagonist in Man of Tai Chi, with Tiger Chen as a martial artist attending underground fights. The Mulan remake in 2020 was Disney's attempt in making a wuxia movie. In 2021, Marvel's Shang-Chi opens with a wuxia sequence and has action sequences inspired by Jackie Chan.

Video games
Some notable wuxia video games of the action RPG genre include The Legend of Sword and Fairy, Xuan-Yuan Sword, Jade Empire, and Kingdom of Paradise, all of which blend wuxia with elements of Chinese mythology and fantasy. The Legend of Sword and Fairy, in particular, expanded into a franchise of eight video games, two of which were adapted into the television series Chinese Paladin (2005) and Chinese Paladin 3 (2009). There are also MMORPGs, such as JX Online 3, Heroes of Kung Fu and Age of Wulin, and hack and slash games, such as Bujingai and Heavenly Sword. 

Games adapted from the works of wuxia writers include Heroes of Jin Yong, an RPG based on characters in Jin Yong's novels; Dragon Oath, an MMORPG inspired by Jin Yong's Demi-Gods and Semi-Devils; and Martial Kingdoms, a strategy game featuring several martial arts schools which commonly appear in wuxia fiction.

The wuxia genre continues to be drawn as a pool of inspiration or source material for Chinese video game studios. In June 2022, Tencent's Lightspeed Studio released a demo trailer on Code: To Jin Yong. In the following month, Everstone Studio unveiled Where Winds Meet, a game compared to Ghost of Tsushima and Assassin's Creed.

See also

List of organisations in wuxia fiction
Martial arts film
Sword and sorcery – a similar western fantasy genre
Xianxia – a subgenre of wuxia novel
Zhou Tong (archer)

References

Further reading
 Jenner, WJF. "Tough Guys, Mateship and Honour: Another Chinese Tradition". East Asian History 12 (1996): 1–34.
 Liu, Petrus. Stateless Subjects: Chinese Martial Arts Fiction and Postcolonial History. Ithaca: Cornell University East Asia Series.
 McCloud, Aaron Matthew Gordon (2010). Papercuts: The Literary and the Martial in the Genre of Wuxia Fiction. Thesis (B.A.). Reed College. .
 汪涌豪 《中国游侠史》 上海：上海文化出版社，1994 [Wang, Yonghao (1994): "History of Chinese Knight-errantry". Shanghai: Shanghai Wenhua Chubanshe]. .

External links
 Early silent wuxia film with English subtitles: Woman Warrior White Rose (1929)
 Early silent wuxia film with English subtitles: Red Heroine (1929)
 Early silent wuxia film with English subtitles: Woman Warrior of the Wild River 6: Rumble at Deerhorn Gully (1930)
 Early musical wuxia film with English subtitles: Hua Mu Lan (1939)
 "HK Martial Arts Cinema" by David Bordwell—An article about wuxia films
 Wuxia, sztylety i wielka miłość. O filmie "Dom Latających Sztyletów" 
 Information on the wuxia genre from a website about actress Zhang Ziyi

 
Chinese literary genres
Chinese martial arts terminology
Chinese warriors
Chinese words and phrases
Fantasy genres
Film genres
Television genres